The Dynamic Billard Leende Open 2016 (sometimes known as the 2016 Dutch  Open) was a 9-Ball pool tournament, and the fifth Euro Tour event of 2016. The event was held between 29 September and 2 October 2016. The event was won by Niels Feijen, who defeated David Alcaide 9–7 in the final.

Albin Ouschan was the defending champion, having defeated Imran Majid 9–2 in the final of the 2015 Leende Open.

Tournament format
The event was played as a double elimination knockout tournament, until the last 32 stage; where the tournament was contested as a single elimination bracket. The event saw a total of 153 players compete.

Prize fund 
The tournament prize fund was similar to that of other Euro Tour events, with €4,500 awarded to the winner of the event.

Tournament results

References

External links

 Official Website

Euro Tour
Sports competitions in Heeze-Leende
Leende Open
Leende Open
Leende Open
International sports competitions hosted by the Netherlands